is a 1970 album by Japanese musician Kuni Kawachi and the Flower Travellin' Band. It was originally credited to  when initially released. The album showcases Kuni Kawachi's progressive rock influences, as well as the growing heavy metal sound that the Flower Travellin' Band were honing.

Overview
It is the first album released by Kuni Kawachi after leaving the group sounds band the Happenings Four. Although sometimes co-credited to the Flower Travellin' Band, only vocalist Joe Yamanaka and guitarist Hideki Ishima took part in the album. It was recorded between Anywhere and Satori, before the band went to Canada. Ishima later recalled that this was the first time he heard Yamanaka sing in Japanese; an experience he referred to as "strange."

In 1971, the song "Works Composed Mainly by Humans" was reworked, renamed "Map" and released as a split single by Flower Travellin' Band without Kawachi, together with the song "Machine Gun Kelly" by American band Jo Mama.

Kirikyogen was later released on CD by King Records. In 2002 it was bootlegged under the name Music Composed Mainly By Humans, which replaced "To Your World" with the live track "I'm Dead" and renamed "Classroom for Women" to simply "Classroom". This bootleg also included "Map", as previously released by Flower Travellin' Band, instead of the original song "Works Composed Mainly by Humans".

Reception
Hernan M. Campbell of Sputnikmusic wrote that with this album the Flower Travellin' Band began "cultivating a heavily dissonant guitar style that emphasized on a low-tuned sound and slower tempos, thus giving their music a more menacing characteristic." Together with Satori, he cited Kirikyogen as playing a part in the creation of doom metal.

Track listing

Credits
Kuni Kawachi - keyboards
Akira "Joe" Yamanaka - vocals
Hideki Ishima - guitars
Pepe Yoshihiro - bass
Chito Kawachi - drums
Yuya Uchida - producer

References

1970 debut albums
Kuni Kawachi albums
Flower Travellin' Band albums
Collaborative albums
Japanese-language albums